Take a Look may refer to:
 Take a Look (Pamela Moore album), 1981
 Take a Look (Natalie Cole album), 1993
 Take a Look (Aretha Franklin album), 1967
 Take a Look (TV series), Canadian 1950's children's historical television series 
 Take a Look (song), a 1988 song by  Level 42
 Against All Odds (Take a Look at Me Now), 1984 Phil Collins song